St. Philomena's Girls High School, Poonthura is a girls' high school in Poonthura, Kerala, India. It is run by the Canossian Daughters of Charity. The school was established in 1952.

References

Canossian educational institutions
Girls' schools in Kerala
Christian schools in Kerala
High schools and secondary schools in Thiruvananthapuram